Michael J. Byrnes is an American author of archeological thrillers. He attended Montclair State University, and received a graduate degree in business administration from Rutgers University.

His first novel was The Sacred Bones (2007), held in 797 libraries and translated into ten languages. Since then he has written two more novels.

Publications
The Sacred Bones (2007) 
French translation,  Le secret du dixième tombeau 
Dutch translation, Het volmaakte relikwie 
Czech translation, Tajemství Chrámové hory : skrývá starověký nález – ostatky Ježíše Krista? 
Serbian translation Svete mošti 
Russian translation, Святая тайна 
Romanian translation "Secretul lui Iosif
Polish translation, Świete kości 
 Portuguese translation, Ossos Sagrados  
Thai translation, ความลับจากโครงกระดูก 
Chinese translation 聖血密碼  
Turkish translation Kutsal kemikler 
The Sacred Blood, (2008)  (a sequel to  The Sacred Bones)
Czech translation, Tajemství svaté krve 
The Genesis Plague (2010) 
Czech translation, Tajemství morové jeskyně

References

American thriller writers
Living people
American male novelists
21st-century American novelists
Montclair State University alumni
Rutgers University alumni
21st-century American male writers
Year of birth missing (living people)